Statistics of Ekstraklasa for the 1960 season.

Overview
It was contested by 12 teams, and Ruch Chorzów won the championship.

League table

Results

Top goalscorers

References
Poland – List of final tables at RSSSF 

Ekstraklasa seasons
1
Pol
Pol